Halomarina (common abbreviation Hmr.) is a genus of halophilic archaea in the family of Halobacteriaceae.

References

Archaea genera
Taxa described in 2011
Halobacteria